The Warsaw Red Sox were a minor league baseball team based in Warsaw, North Carolina. From 1947 to 1948, the Warsaw Red Sox played exclusively as members of the Class D level Tobacco State League, hosting home minor league games at Warsaw Park.

History 
Warsaw, North Carolina first hosted minor league play in 1947. The Warsaw "Red Sox" began play as members of the eight–team Class D level Tobacco State League. The Clinton Blues, Dunn-Erwin Twins, Lumberton Cubs, Red Springs Red Robins, Sanford Spinners, Smithfield-Selma Leafs and Wilmington Pirates joined Lumberton in the second season of Tobacco League play.

The 1947 league accepted applications and expanded from six to eight teams, adding the Lumberton, Red Springs and Warsaw franchises as new members for the 1947 season, with the Angier-Fuquay Springs Bulls franchise folding.

In 1947, S.W. Marriner was reported to be president of the Warsaw Red Sox, with Arthur Apple serving as vice–president and business manager.

The Warsaw Red Sox reportedly hosted their home opener on Tuesday, April 19, 1947, in a contest against the Clinton Blues at 7:45 P.M. at Warsaw Park. It was noted the Goldsboro High School Band was to "present music for the occasion." Prior to the beginning the season, Warsaw played home exhibition games against the Wilmington Pirates and the Wallace All–Stars. It was noted the final Wilmington exhibition game was designated "ladies day" for the Sunday game, with ladies admitted free.

In their first season of play, the 1947 Warsaw Red Sox ended the season in 5th place. Playing in the eight–team league, Warsaw ended the regular season with a 59–64 record under manager James Milner. Warsaw finished 12.5 games behind of the 1st place Sanford Spinners. The Red Sox did not qualify for the four team playoffs, won by the Sanford Spinners. Pitcher Carl Johnson of Warsaw led the Tobacco State League with 225 strikeouts.

In 1948, the Warsaw Red Sox continued play as members of the Class D level Tobacco State League. The Reds ended the regular season in 5th place with a 71–67 record, playing under managers Sam Gibson and Verne Blackwell. Warsaw finished 8.5 games behind the 1st placed Sanford Spinners in the final standings. The Red Sox did not qualify for the playoffs, won by the Reeds Springs Robins.

The Warsaw Red Sox folded following the 1948 season and were replaced by the Fayetteville Scotties franchise in 1949 Tobacco State League play.

Warsaw, North Carolina has not hosted another minor league team.

The ballpark
The Warsaw Red Sox minor league teams were noted to have hosted home games at Warsaw Park. The park is called Taylor Field today, with recreational baseball and softball facilities. Taylor Field is located on George Street, Warsaw, North Carolina.

Timeline

Year–by–year records

Notable alumni

Sam Gibson (1948, MGR)
Leo Katkaveck (1948)

See also
Warsaw Red Sox players

References

External links
Baseball Reference

Defunct minor league baseball teams
Professional baseball teams in North Carolina
Defunct baseball teams in North Carolina
Baseball teams established in 1947
Baseball teams disestablished in 1948
Tobacco State League teams